Robert J. Weryk (born 1981) is a Canadian physicist and astronomer. He currently works at the University of Hawaii at Manoa where he discovered the first known interstellar object, ʻOumuamua.  He has also published numerous articles on meteors and other astronomical topics.

References

1981 births
Living people
Canadian physicists
21st-century Canadian astronomers
University of Hawaiʻi at Mānoa faculty